Barkeria, abbreviated Bark in horticultural trade, is a genus of orchids. It consists of about 17 currently recognized (May 2014) species native to Mexico and Central America. This genus was once considered part of Epidendrum. Type species is Barkeria elegans; this is now considered a synonym of B. uniflora yet retains its status as type per ICN.

These are deciduous orchids, which drop their leaves in early winter. They are found in dry scrub areas of Mesoamerica at intermediate elevations.

Species
Following species are accepted as of May 2014:

Barkeria archilarum Chiron - Guatemala
Barkeria barkeriola Rchb. f.  - Sinaloa, Nayarit, Jalisco
Barkeria delpinalii Archila & Chiron - Guatemala
Barkeria dorotheae Halb - Colima, Jalisco
Barkeria fritz-halbingeriana Soto Arenas  - Oaxaca
Barkeria lindleyana Bateman ex Lindl. 
Barkeria lindleyana var. lindleyana  - Costa Rica, El Salvador, Guatemala, Honduras 
Barkeria lindleyana subsp. vanneriana (Rchb. f.) Thien - Puebla, Guerrero, Oaxaca
Barkeria melanocaulon A. Rich. & Galeotti - Oaxaca
Barkeria naevosa (Lindl.) Schltr. - Oaxaca, Guerrero
Barkeria obovata (C. Presl) Christenson - from central Mexico to Panama
Barkeria palmeri (Rolfe) Schltr. - Colima, Jalisco, Nayarit, Sinaloa
Barkeria scandens (La Llave & Lex.) Dressler & Halb. - central Mexico
Barkeria schoemakeri Halb. - Sinaloa, Michoacan, Oaxaca
Barkeria skinneri (Bateman ex Lindl.) A. Rich. & Galeotti - Guatemala, Chiapas
Barkeria spectabilis Bateman ex Lindl. - El Salvador, Chiapas, Guatemala, Honduras, Nicaragua
Barkeria strophinx (Rchb. f.) Halb. - Michoacán
Barkeria uniflora (La Llave & Lex.) Dressler & Halb. - central Mexico
Barkeria whartoniana (C. Schweinf.) Soto Arenas - Oaxaca

References

External links

 
Laeliinae genera
Orchids of Mexico
Orchids of Central America